The Lilley Road—Lower Rouge River Bridge is an automotive bridge located on Lilley Road over the Lower River Rouge in Canton, Michigan. It was listed on the National Register of Historic Places in 2000.

History
The Lilley Road Bridge spanning the Lower Rouge River was originally built in 1923–1924 by the Massillon Bridge Company of Massillon, Ohio, for installation where Telegraph Road crossed a branch of the River Rouge just north of Warren Road.  However, just ten years later, Wayne County widened Telegraph, necessitating the removal of the bridge.  At the same time, the county took responsibility for the Lilley Road crossing of the Lower River Rouge, which had been previously maintained by Canton Township.  The county reworked the river channel and installed the truss bridge previously removed from the Telegraph Road site.  The structural and historical integrity of the bridge was well-maintained during the re-installation.

Description
The Lilley Road Bridge over the Lower River Rouge is an eight-panel Pratt camelback pony truss with an upper chord constructed from back-to-back channels tied by X-lacing, a lower chord constructed from channels with battens, and a floor of built-up I-beams riveted to superstructure.

See also

References

External links
Bridge photos from www.historicbridges.org

Road bridges on the National Register of Historic Places in Michigan
Bridges completed in 1923
Bridges in Wayne County, Michigan
National Register of Historic Places in Wayne County, Michigan
1923 establishments in Michigan